Nathan Jones (born 21 August 1969) is an Australian actor, powerlifting champion, strongman and former professional wrestler. He is best known for his time in WWE. 
He held the WWA World Heavyweight Championship once in World Wrestling All-Stars, and aligned himself with The Undertaker in World Wrestling Entertainment on its SmackDown brand.

Early life
Jones was born in Gold Coast, Queensland, Australia. Before his career as a wrestler, Jones was sentenced to 16 years in 1987 at the age of 18 to Boggo Road Gaol for eight armed robberies between 1985 and 1987, two of which occurred in Tasmania. During the robberies, he became one of Australia's most wanted and ended up serving seven years in a maximum-security prison. In 1994, Jones was given one-year work release before being discharged at the age of 25. While in prison, he was introduced to the sport of powerlifting. He is also alleged to have begun taking steroids during this time. Within a short space of time, he became the National Powerlifting Champion of Australia.

Strongman career

Upon his release, Jones also began competing in strongman contests and during this time, he was dubbed "Megaman". As the reigning Australia's Strongest Man, he entered the World Strength Championship at Callander, Scotland, on 29–30 July 1995. He took first place, topping a field that included 1993 World's Strongest Man Gary Taylor. The following weekend, he competed in the World Muscle Power Classic held at Mintlaw, Aberdeenshire, Scotland. That contest was won by Magnús Ver Magnússon, with Nathan finishing fifth in a field of twelve competitors.

Jones next took part in the 1995 World's Strongest Man contest. After quickly defeating Phil Martin twice in the arm wrestling event in the qualifying heat, Jones was then matched against Magnus Samuelsson, who had been Europe's arm wrestling champion for several years and who would become the World's Strongest Man in 1998. Samuelsson won the first round. In the second round Jones refused to go down and pulled with his opposite arm, twisting his body. This resulted in breaking the arm he was using to wrestle (a spiral fracture of the humerus), and he subsequently was out of the competition. Jones returned to Strongman competition in 1996, winning the World Strongman Challenge, and placed third in a World's Strongest Man qualifying heat behind Magnús Ver Magnússon and Jorma Ojanaho.

Mixed martial arts career
He also participated in a mixed martial arts match at Pride Fighting Championships's debut event Pride 1 in October 1997, facing Japanese professional wrestler and former grand sumo champion Koji Kitao. Jones was submitted after being caught in an armlock.

Professional wrestling career

World Wrestling All-Stars (2001–2002)
After working as a bodyguard for multimillionaire Rene Rivkin, Jones began a career in wrestling during this time. Jones first gained fame working in World Wrestling All-Stars, making a large impression at the first WWA pay-per-view "Inception", where he was accompanied to the ring by Rove McManus. However, he was defeated after Rove was smashed with Jeff Jarrett's guitar and Jones was hit with the Stroke.

During his time in the WWA, Nathan won the WWA World Heavyweight Championship on 7 April 2002 before losing the belt to Scott Steiner only 5 days later.

Pro Wrestling Zero1-Max (2002)
After the title loss, Jones began performing for Pro Wrestling Zero1-Max in June. On 20 October, Jones and Jon Heidenreich defeated Masato Tanaka and Shinjiro Otani to win the NWA Intercontinental Tag Team Championship. On 25 October, Jones and Heidenreich successfully retained the title against Jimmy Snuka Jr. For the 2nd time. and The Predator before losing the title the next day to Naoya Ogawa and Shinya Hashimoto.

World Wrestling Entertainment (2002–2003)
After Jones initially signed his contract with World Wrestling Entertainment (WWE), he was unable to work in the United States because of visa issues stemming from his criminal history. In late 2002 and early 2003, Jones began performing in dark matches for World Wrestling Entertainment. He was originally promoted as a "Hannibal Lecter" type character. On 10 April 2003 episode of SmackDown!, Jones made his televised WWE in-ring debut and defeated Bill DeMott.

Upon debuting, Jones' original character was nixed, and he was put into a storyline with The Undertaker as his protégé and helper during Undertaker's feud with A-Train and The Big Show. At WrestleMania XIX, Jones and Undertaker were scheduled to face Big Show and A-Train in a Tag Team match, but at the last minute, the match was made a handicap match instead. On screen, Jones was attacked pre-match and left injured. Near the closing moments of the match, Jones reappeared and attacked Big Show, enabling Undertaker to pin A-Train for the victory. Jones was then sent to Ohio Valley Wrestling to improve his skills.

Jones was then absent from television for several months until returning in the fall of 2003 as a villain known by the nickname "The Colossus of Boggo Road", a title referring to his time spent in Boggo Road Gaol. He was paired with Paul Heyman on-screen, with Heyman taking on the role of SmackDown! General Manager. He was also immediately placed into Brock Lesnar's Survivor Series team, which also included A-Train, Big Show, and Matt Morgan in order to compete against Lesnar's rival Kurt Angle and his team. At Survivor Series, Jones was eliminated by Angle after he submitted to the Ankle lock. Team Lesnar was defeated by Team Angle and Jones was then relegated to interfere in Lesnar's matches along with the other members of Team Lesnar. He was also placed in matches by either Lesnar or Heyman to aid them. On 6 December 2003, Jones quit the company due to the rigor of WWE's heavy travel schedules while on tour in Perth, Australia.

Post-WWE and retirement
After leaving WWE, Jones was scheduled to make his pro wrestling return in 2004 at the Australian Wrestling Supershow III, booked against Mark Mercedes. Jones did not appear as advertised and a battle royal was held following an angry shoot promo on Jones by Mercedes and promoter Andy Raymond.

In 2005, he wrestled three matches for World Series Wrestling. On 5 October, he defeated Lee Star and on 7 and 8 October, he defeated Mark Hilton. After his last match with Hilton, Jones immediately retired from wrestling.

In 2008, Jones signed with Total Nonstop Action Wrestling, but nerve damage caused by a cement truck hitting his left arm kept him sidelined for the first three months. He never wrestled for the promotion.

Championships and accomplishments
 Pro Wrestling Illustrated
 PWI ranked him #137 of the Top 500 singles wrestlers in the PWI 500 in 2003
 Pro Wrestling ZERO1-MAX
 NWA Intercontinental Tag Team Championship (1 time) – with Jon Heidenreich
 World Wrestling All-Stars
 WWA World Heavyweight Championship (1 time)
 Wrestling Observer Newsletter
 Most Embarrassing Wrestler (2003)
 Worst Wrestler (2003)

Mixed martial arts record

|-
|Loss
|align=center|0-1
|Koji Kitao
|Submission (keylock)
|PRIDE 1
|
|align=center|1
|align=center|2:14
|Tokyo, Japan
|

Filmography

Film

Television

References

External links

1970 births
Living people
20th-century Australian criminals
20th-century professional wrestlers
21st-century professional wrestlers
Australian male professional wrestlers
Australian male mixed martial artists
Australian powerlifters
Australian rugby league players
Australian strength athletes
Mixed martial artists utilizing wrestling
Mixed martial artists from the Gold Coast
Norths Devils players
Rugby league players from Gold Coast, Queensland
Super heavyweight mixed martial artists
Male actors from the Gold Coast, Queensland
Male powerlifters